The badminton women's doubles tournament at the 1994 Asian Games in Hiroshima took place from 12 October to 15 October at Tsuru Memorial Gymnasium.

The South Korea duo of Shim Eun-jung and Jang Hye-ock won the gold in this tournament. Another Korean team of Chung So-young and Gil Young-ah finished second they lost the final 2–0, Chinese team of Ge Fei and Gu Jun and Japanese team of Tomomi Matsuo and Kyoko Sasage shared the bronze medal.

Schedule
All times are Japan Standard Time (UTC+09:00)

Results

References
Results

External links
Results

Women's doubles